The Tirabuzon Formation is a geologic formation in Mexico. It preserves fossils dating back to the Neogene period, Pliocene epoch.

Fossil content 
The following fossils have been reported:

Mammals

 aff. Pontoporia species
 cf. Scaphokogia species
 Stenella species
 Balaenopterinae indeterminate
 Otariinae indeterminate
 Phocoeninae indeterminate
 Kogiidae indeterminate
 Physeteridae indeterminate

Sharks

 Carcharhinus brachylurus
 Carcharhinus galapagensis
 Carcharhinus albimarginatus
 Carcharhinus velox
 Carcharhinus limbatus
 Carcharhinus altimus
 Carcharhinus falciformis
 Carcharhinus obscurus
 Carcharhinus leucas
 Carcharodon carcharias
 Carcharodon sulcidens
 Galeocerdo rosaliaensis
 Hemipristis serra
 Hexanchus griseus
 Isurus benedeni
 Isurus oxyrinchus
 Megalodon
 Odontaspis acutissima
 Prionace glauca
 Rhizoprionodon longurio
 Sphyrna vespertina
 Sphyrna mokarran
 Sphyrna zygaena
 Sphyrna lewini
 Sphyrna media
 Cetorhinus species
 Heterodontus species
 Notorhynchus species
 Squalus species

Bivalves

 Argopecten ventricosus
 Argopecten cf. callidus
 Argopecten mendenhalli
 Chagrepecten dallasi
 Chlamys corteziana
 Chlamys opuntia
 Euvola vogdesi
 Flabellipecten stearnsii
 Flabellipecten refugioensis
 Leopecten bakeri
 Leptopecten latiauratus
 Nodipecten subnodosus
 Patinopecten santarosaliensis
 Patinopecten species

See also 

 List of fossiliferous stratigraphic units in Mexico

References

External links 
 

Geologic formations of Mexico
Pliocene Series of North America
Neogene Mexico
Siltstone formations
Mudstone formations
Sandstone formations
Fossiliferous stratigraphic units of North America
Paleontology in Mexico